Dam tot Damloop (Dam to Dam Run in English) is an annual road running competition held in North Holland in the Netherlands. It is a Silver Label 10-mile race from Amsterdam to Zaandam. The event was first held as a fun run event in 1985 and elite runners were invited the following year, with world record holder Fernando Mamede and Dutch record holder Carla Beurskens taking the men's and women's titles. In the first five years of its running, Beurskens became a three-time winner of the race – an achievement since matched by Heléna Barócsi, Hellen Kimaiyo, Tegla Loroupe and Lornah Kiplagat.

From the 1990s onwards, the elite race has been dominated by East African (particularly Kenyan) runners. Indeed, since 1993 the winners of the men's and women's races have been Kenyan-born on all but six occasions. Leonard Patrick Komon is the current men's course record holder with his time of 44:27 minutes in 2011 (the second fastest ever for the distance). Ingrid Kristiansen set the current women's record in 1987 with her run of 50:31 minutes.

The race was an IAAF Label Road Race in the period 2013-2019.

The race is jointly organised by Stichting Sportevenementen Le Champion and two running clubs (AV Atos and AV Aalsmeer). In addition to the main 10-mile race, the event hosts shorter races for children and several business team competitions. The Dam tot Damloop 10-miler attracts high level of participation: almost 10,000 runners competed in 1990, rising to almost 20,000 in 1999 and almost 40,000 in 2008.

Damloop by night
The Damloop by night takes place the evening before the main Dam tot Damloop race. It is a 5-mile race in the dark through the centre of Zaandam.

Past winners
Key:

References

List of winners
van Hemert, Wim et al. (2012-11-20).  Dam tot Dam 10 mile. Association of Road Racing Statisticians. Retrieved on 2013-01-27.

External links 

 
Top finishers by year

10-mile runs
Athletics competitions in the Netherlands
Recurring sporting events established in 1985
1985 establishments in the Netherlands
Annual sporting events in the Netherlands
Autumn events in the Netherlands
Annual events in Amsterdam
Sports competitions in Amsterdam